HMS Dorsetshire (pennant number 40) was a  heavy cruiser of the British Royal Navy, named after the English county, now usually known as Dorset. Dorsetshire was built at the Portsmouth Dockyard; her keel was laid in September 1927, she was launched in January 1929, and was completed in September 1930.

Dorsetshire served initially in the Atlantic Fleet in the early 1930s, before moving to become the flagship of the Commander-in-Chief, Africa in 1933, and then to the China Station in late 1935. She remained there until the outbreak of the Second World War in September 1939, when she was transferred to the South Atlantic. There, she reinforced the search for the German heavy cruiser . In late May 1941, Dorsetshire took part in the final engagement with the battleship Bismarck, which ended when Dorsetshire was ordered to close and torpedo the crippled German battleship. She joined searches for the heavy cruiser  in August and the auxiliary cruiser  in November.

In March 1942, Dorsetshire was transferred to the Eastern Fleet to support British forces in the recently opened Pacific Theatre of the war. At the end of the month, the Japanese fast carrier task force—the Kido Butai—launched the Indian Ocean raid. On 5 April, Japanese aircraft spotted Dorsetshire and her sister  while en route to Colombo; a force of dive bombers then attacked the two ships and sank them. More than 1,100 men were rescued the next day, out of a combined crew of over 1,500.

Description

Dorsetshire was propelled by four Parsons steam turbines that drove four screw propellers. Steam was provided by eight oil-fired 3-drum water-tube boilers. She had a crew of 710 officers and enlisted men.

Dorsetshire was armed with a main battery of eight BL  Mk VIII 50-cal. guns in four twin turrets, in two superfiring pairs forward and aft. As built, the cruiser had a secondary battery that included four  dual-purpose guns (DP) in single mounts. She also carried four QF 2-pounder anti-aircraft guns, also in single mounts. Her armament was rounded out by eight  torpedo tubes mounted in two quadruple launchers.

In 1931, Dorsetshire began to carry a seaplane; a catapult was installed the following year to allow her to launch the aircraft while underway. In 1937, her secondary battery was overhauled. Eight QF 4-inch Mk XVI DP guns in twin turrets replaced the single mounts, and the single 2-pounders were replaced with eight twin-mounts. During the Second World War, her anti-aircraft battery was strengthened by the addition of nine  guns.

Service history

Pre-war
Dorsetshire was laid down at the Portsmouth Dockyard on 21 September 1927 and was launched on 21 January 1929. After completing fitting-out work on 30 September 1930 she was commissioned into the Royal Navy. Upon commissioning, Dorsetshire became the flagship of the 2nd Cruiser Squadron. In 1931, she was part of the Atlantic Fleet during the Invergordon Mutiny. During the incident, some of her men initially refused to assemble for duty but after an hour and a half, the ship's officers had restored order and no further unrest troubled Dorsetshire during the mutiny. By September 1935, Dorsetshire was assigned to the China Station. From 1–4 February 1937, Dorsetshire, the aircraft carrier  and the cruiser  participated in an exercise to test the defences of Singapore against a hypothetical Japanese attack.

Second World War
At the start of the Second World War in September 1939, Dorsetshire was still on the China Station. In October, Dorsetshire—with other Royal Navy ships—was sent to South American waters in pursuit of the German heavy cruiser , which was attacking British merchant traffic in the area. Dorsetshire was assigned with her sister ship  and the aircraft carrier . Dorsetshire had just arrived in Simonstown, South Africa, from Colombo on 9 December, with orders to proceed to Tristan da Cunha and then to Port Stanley in the Falkland Islands to relieve . After departing Simonstown, she received the order to join the hunt for Admiral Graf Spee. She left South Africa on 13 December in company with the cruiser  and was in transit on 17 December when the Germans scuttled Admiral Graf Spee following the Battle of the River Plate.

Exeter had been badly damaged in the battle with Admiral Graf Spee, and Dorsetshire escorted her back to Britain in January 1940, before returning to South American waters to search for German supply ships. Dorsetshire arrived on the scene shortly thereafter, picked up ten officers and thirty-five crewmen and sank Wakama to prevent her from being a navigational hazard. The following month, the President of Panama, Augusto Samuel Boyd, sent a formal complaint to the British government protesting against Dorsetshires violation of the Pan-American Security Zone in the Wakama incident.

In May, Dorsetshire underwent a short refit in Simonstown, before returning to Britain for a more thorough overhaul. On 23 June, she set out from Freetown to watch the French battleship , which left Dakar for Casablanca two days later. While en route, Dorsetshire rendezvoused with the aircraft carrier Hermes off Dakar. Richelieu was ordered to return to Dakar by Admiral François Darlan later that day and she arrived on 27 June. Dorsetshire continued to monitor the French Navy off Dakar and on 3 July, the French submarines  and  attempted to intercept her. Dorsetshire was able to evade their attacks through high-speed manoeuvres. On 5 July, Hermes and the Australian cruiser  joined her there. On 7 July, the squadron was ordered to issue an ultimatum to the French fleet, to either surrender and be interned under British control or to scuttle their ships; the French refused, so a fast sloop was sent in to drop depth charges under the stern of Richelieu to disable her screws.

On 4 September, she was dry-docked at Durban and on the 20th she arrived back in Simonstown. She sailed for Sierra Leone the next day. Operating in the Indian Ocean, on 18 November she bombarded Zante in Italian Somaliland. On 18 December she departed to join the search for the heavy cruiser , which had recently sunk the British refrigerator ship Duquesa in the South Atlantic. The British were unsuccessful in their search and Admiral Scheer remained at large.

Bismarck

In late May 1941, Dorsetshire was one of the ships deployed to hunt the German battleship  in the North Atlantic. By 08:33, Dorsetshire encountered the destroyer , which had been engaging Bismarck throughout the night.

Shortly thereafter, Dorsetshire took part in Bismarcks last battle; after the battleships  and  neutralised Bismarcks main battery early in the engagement, Dorsetshire and other warships—including her sister —closed in to join the attack. In the course of the engagement, she fired 254 shells from her main battery. In the final moments of the battle, she was ordered to move closer and torpedo Bismarck and fired three torpedoes, two of which hit the crippled battleship. The Germans had by this time detonated scuttling charges, which with the damage inflicted by the British, caused Bismarck to rapidly sink at 10:40.

Admiral John Tovey, the British commander, ordered Dorsetshire and the destroyer  to pick up survivors. A reported U-boat sighting forced the two ships to break off the rescue effort. Historians Holger Herwig and David Bercuson state that only 110 men were rescued: 85 aboard Dorsetshire and 25 aboard Maori.

Rodney, King George V and the destroyers ,  and Cossack had meanwhile begun to steam north-west to return to Scapa Flow. After abandoning the rescue effort, Dorsetshire and Maori caught up with the rest of the fleet shortly after 12:00. Late that night, as the fleet steamed off Britain, Dorsetshire was detached to stop in the Tyne. She had suffered no casualties in the battle with Bismarck.

Deployment to South Africa and the Indian Ocean

In late August, Dorsetshire participated in the search for the heavy cruiser . Dorsetshire, Eagle and the light cruiser  left Freetown on 29 August, though they were unable to locate the German raider. On 4 November, Dorsetshire and the auxiliary cruiser , were sent to investigate reports of a German surface raider in the South Atlantic but neither ship found anything. In November–December, WS-24, a convoy of 10 troop transport ships, steamed out from Halifax, Canada en route to Basra, Iraq. After arriving in Cape Town on 9 December, Dorsetshire took over the escort duties and the convoy was diverted to Bombay, where it arrived on 24 December.

Dorsetshire was deployed in November, to join the search for the German commerce raider , that had been attacking Allied shipping off the coast of Africa. On 1 December, Dorsetshire intercepted the German supply ship Python, based on Ultra intelligence. The German ship was refuelling a pair of U-boats—  and —in the South Atlantic. The U-boats dived while Python tried to flee. UA fired five torpedoes at Dorsetshire but all missed her due to her evasive manoeuvres. Dorsetshire fired a salvo to stop Python and the latter's crew abandoned the ship, after detonating scuttling charges. Dorsetshire left the Germans in their boats, since the U-boats still presented too much of a threat for the British to pick up the Germans.

Loss

In 1942, Dorsetshire, under the command of Augustus Agar, was assigned to the Eastern Fleet in the Indian Ocean. Somerville received reports of an impending Japanese attack in the Indian Ocean—the Indian Ocean raid—and so he put his fleet to sea on 31 March. Having not encountered any hostile forces by 4 April, he withdrew to refuel. Dorsetshire and her sister ship Cornwall were sent to Colombo to replenish their fuel.

The next day, she and Cornwall were spotted by reconnaissance aircraft from the heavy cruiser . In the span of about eight minutes, Dorsetshire was hit by ten  and  bombs and several near misses; she sank stern first at about 13:50. One of the bombs detonated an ammunition magazine and contributed to her rapid sinking. Cornwall was hit eight times and sank bow first about ten minutes later. Between the two ships, 1,122 men out of a total of 1,546 were picked up by the cruiser  and the destroyers  and  the next day.

Footnotes

References

Further reading

External links

 Official History map of the loss of Dorsetshire

Kent-class cruisers
County-class cruisers of the Royal Navy
Ships built in Portsmouth
1929 ships
World War II cruisers of the United Kingdom
World War II shipwrecks in the Indian Ocean
Maritime incidents in April 1942
Cruisers sunk by aircraft
Ships sunk by Japanese aircraft
Naval magazine explosions